Eduardo Gallardo (born 20 April 1969) is an Argentine handball coach. At the 2012 Summer Olympics he coached the Argentina men's national handball team.

References

Living people
1969 births
Argentine handball coaches
Handball coaches of international teams